A yo-yo is a toy.

Yo-yo may also refer to:

People
 Yo-Yo (rapper) (born 1971), American hip hop artist
 Yo-Yo Davalillo (1931–2013), Venezuelan Major League Baseball player
 Yo-Yo Ma (born 1955), Chinese-American cellist

Art, entertainment, and media

Music
 The Yo-Yos, a British rock band
 Yo-Yo (album), a 1996 album by The Choirboys

Songs
 "Yo-Yo" (Billy Joe Royal song), a 1966 pop song, also covered by The Osmonds
 "Yo-Yo" (Joey Moe song), a 2009 pop song
 "Yo-Yo" (Nicola Roberts song), a 2012 electropop song
 "Yo-Yo", a 1981 rock song by The Kinks from Give the People What They Want
 "Yo-Yo", a 2001 dance-pop song by Mandy Moore from Mandy Moore

Other

Science and technology

Air and space
 Aero Eli Serviza Yo-Yo 222, an Italian helicopter
 Yo-yo de-spin, a technique for slowing the spin of rockets
 Yo-Yo, a type of aircraft maneuver

Other
 Yo-Yo (ride) or swing ride, a type of amusement park ride
 Yo-yo dieting, a phrase describing weight fluctuations experienced by dieters
 Yo-yo problem, an antipattern encountered in software development

Other uses
 Yo-yo (algorithm), a distributed algorithm
 Yo-yo club, in association football, a frequently relegated and promoted club
 Yo-yo Tsuri, a type of Japanese water balloon
 Yo-Yo, a sweet biscuit made in Australia by Arnott's Biscuits
 Yo-yo, a Venezuelan food made with cooking bananas

See also
 Yoyo (disambiguation)
 Jojo (disambiguation)
 Yo (disambiguation)